The yellow-breasted antwren (Herpsilochmus axillaris) is a species of bird in the family Thamnophilidae. It is found in Colombia, Ecuador, and Peru. Its natural habitat is subtropical or tropical moist montane forests.

References

yellow-breasted antwren
Birds of the Northern Andes
yellow-breasted antwren
Taxonomy articles created by Polbot